Le Trait is a commune in the Seine-Maritime department in the Normandy region in north-western France.

Geography
An ex-shipbuilding town, nowadays involved in farming, forestry, light industry and port activity. Technip produces flexible pipes for the offshore oil industry in Le Trait and is the biggest employer.

Heraldry

Population

Places of interest
 The church of St. Nicolas, dating from the thirteenth century.
 The ruins of a twelfth-century castle.

See also
Communes of the Seine-Maritime department

References

Bibliography
 Maurice Quemin, Le Trait, berceau de 200 navires, que sont-ils devenus ?, 1988 .

External links

Official website of the commune 
Le Trait photographers club website 

Communes of Seine-Maritime